LR132 or (+)-3,4-dichloro-N-[(1R,2S)-2-(1-pyrrolidinyl)cyclohexyl]benzeneethanamine is a selective sigma receptor antagonist, with a reported binding affinity of Ki = 2 ± 0.1 nM for the sigma-1 receptor and more than 350 times selectivity over the sigma-2 receptor.

Consistent with other reported sigma receptor antagonists, pretreating Swiss Webster mice with LR132 significantly decreases the convulsivity and lethality of cocaine.

See also

 BD1008
 BD1031

References

Sigma antagonists